Carles Santos (1 July 1940 – 4 December 2017) was a Spanish artist who began his career as a pianist and later worked in many other creative disciplines, including musical composition, filmmaking, screenwriting, acting, scenic musical shows, graphics, montage, sculpture, photography,  poetry, and prose.

Biography
Born in Vinaròs, Valencian Community (Spain) Carles Santos began his formal  musical education at the prestigious Conservatori Superior de Música del Liceu in Barcelona.  There, he received awards that gave him the opportunity to continue his studies  in Paris, where he worked with Magda Tagliaferro, Jacques Février, Robert Casadesus, and Marguerite Long, among others.  Later he studied with Harry Datymer in Switzerland.  In 1961, he began his career as a pianist, with a repertoire that included works by Béla Bartók, Arnold Schoenberg, and Anton Webern.  During these years, he also played the musical parts of Joan Brossa's Concert Irregular, which premiered in Barcelona and New York as part of the commemoration of the 75th birthday of Joan Miró.  A grant awarded by the Juan March Foundation in 1968 allowed Santos to move to the United States, where he met and worked with a number of avant-garde artists, principally Philip Corner and including John Cage.

In the late 1960s, Santos turned his attention to the production of films, and his oeuvre in this discipline eventually grew to include short films, full-length films, documentaries, and videos.  Over the years, he collaborated with such directors as Pere Portabella, Jordi Cadena, and Carles Durán.  His own first short film, L'Apat,  premiered in 1967.

During the 1970s, Santos increasingly devoted himself to performing his own compositions, and  eventually he decided to play them exclusively.  His compositions are decidedly minimalistic and at the same time bear the stamp of romantic,  traditional Spanish, atonal, and 12-tone music.  In these years and into the 1980s, he took part in a number of important musical events, including the Festival d'Automne in Paris, the Musicalia in Milan, the International New Jazz Festival in Moers, Germany, the Biennial in San Juan, Puerto Rico, the Zürcher Theater Spektakel in Zurich, the Music Theatre Festival in London,  Wintermusik '82 in Karlsruhe, Germany, and New Music America '83  in Washington, DC.  In his performances, his goal was to avoid the boredom often caused in the audience by certain avant-garde music.

In the 1980s, Santos began to design scenic musical shows, which he staged in such venues as the Sydney Opera House, the Hebbel Theater in Berlin, and the Palau de la Música Catalana in Barcelona.  His musical shows are marked by extravagance, sexual themes, and deliberate provocation, with the goal of questioning established concepts, albeit with a sense of humor.  The notes to the 2006 exhibition of Santos's costumes held in Barcelona at the Museu del Tèxtil i la Indumentaria (Mariaelena Roqué desvesteix Carles Santos [Mariaelena Roqué Undresses Carles Santos]), indicate that Santos, through his shows, is expressing his loves and fears and attempting to banish his personal demons.

Santos was commissioned to compose works for a variety of special occasions, including the opening ceremonies of the 1992 Summer Olympic Games in Barcelona and the opening of the 2001 Biennial of Arts in Valencia.

A major retrospective of Santos's works titled Visca el Piano (Long Live the Piano) was held in 2006 at the Fundació Joan Miró in Barcelona.  The exhibition included videos of his scenic musical shows, graphic and photographic works, montages, and kinetic sculptures.  The last category included a waltzing player piano that whirled around the exhibition hall under its own power while playing music by Bach and somehow avoiding running into the other exhibits (http://www.last.fm/music/Carles+Santos/+videos/+1-TZK3HCmZlmE).

In 2009, he was the invited artist at the Fira Mediterrania in Manresa (Catalonia, Spain).

Selected awards and prizes
1990  Premi National de Composició de la Generalitat de Catalunya
1993  Premi Ciutat de Barcelona (for best musical composition)
1996  Premi Ciutat de Barcelona (for international projection)
1999  Creu de Sant Jordi de la Generalitat de Catalunya
2000  Premios Max (for best soundtrack)
2000  Premio de la Critica de Barcelona (for best musical show)
2001  Premios Max (for best composition and musical direction)
2002  Premios Max (for best musical composition)
2003  Premios Max (for best musical direction and musical composition)
2005  Premios Max (for best musical show,  direction, and composition)
2006  Medalla de Oro del Circulo de Bellas Artes
2008  Premio Nacional de Música / Composición
2009  Medalla de la Universidad Jaume I de Castelló

Discography
1977  Piano - Obres de Cowell, Cage, Webern, Stockhausen i Mestres-Quadreny (Edigsa)
1981  Voice Tracks (R. A. Taylor)
1984  Pianotrack (Linterna Música)
1986  Perturbación inesperada (Linterna Música)
1988  Carles Santos: Piano (Grabaciones Accidentales)
1989  Five Voices - Greetje Bijma/Shelley Hirsch/Anna Homler/David Moss/Carles Santos (Intakt Records)
1991  Belmonte - Banda Simfònica de la Unió Musical de Llíria - Carles Santos (Virgin España)
1992  Música para las Ceremonias Olímpicas Barcelona 92 - Fanfàrria de Cerimònies, Banda Simfònica de la Unió Musical de Llíria, Cor de València, cor d'Asdrúbila, Orquestra Ciutat de Barcelona - Carles Santos (On the Rocks)
1993 Promenade Concert: Músical per a una acció original de Xavier Olivé. 20 d’Abril de 1993 (Fundació Joan Miró)
1995  Himne del Segon Congrès Català de Cuina (Indústria Cultural)
1995  La porca i vibràtica teclúria (Institut d'Edicions de la Diputació de Barcelona)
1998  Un dit és un dit (CD inclós en el número 9 de la revista "Cave Canis", Barcelona 1999)
2001  L'adéu de Lucrècia Borja (Universitat de València)
2002  Sama Samaruck Suck Suck (Ópera-Circ) (K. Indústria Cultural)
2006 Amores Cage (Dahiz Producciones)

Filmography

Musical composition for full-length films
1968  Nocturn 29 (together with Josep Maria Mestres-Quadreny; directed by Pere Portabella)
1970  Cuadecuc, vampir (Pere Portabella)
1975  Informe general (Pere Portabella)
1977  L'obscura història de la cosina Montse (Jordi Cadena)
1981  Vértigo en Manhattan (Jet lag) (Gonzalo Herralde)
1981  Barcelona Sud (Jordi Cadena)
1984  Pà d'àngel (Francesc Bellmunt)
1990  Ponte varsòvia (Pere Portabella)
1988  És quan dormo que hi veig clar (Jordi Cadena)
1989  Pont de Varsòvia (The Warsaw Bridge) (Pere Portabella)
1998  El pianista (Mario Gas)
2007  Die Stille vor Bach (The silence before Bach) (Pere Portabella)

Musical composition for short films
1969  Miró l’altre (directed by Pere Portabella)
1970  Poetes Catalans (Pere Portabella)
1971  Semejante a Pedro (Francesc Bellmunt)
1971  Calidoscopi (Beni Rossell)
1972  Umbracle (Pere Portabella)
1972  Cantants 72 (Pere Portabella)
1973  Advocats laboralistes (Pere Portabella)
1978  El barri del Besós (Carles Durán)
1979  Laberint (Agusti Villaronga)
1979  La delinqüència (Jaume Codina)
1979  Setmana de la sanitat (Jordi Cadena)
1979  L'ajuntament (Georgina Cisquella and Pere Joan Ventura)
1979  L'agressió quotidiana (Carles Durán)
1981  L'assemblea de Catalunya (Carles Durán)
1982  Eleccions a Las Cortes 28-10-82 (Isona Passola)
1989  Romàntic (Aurora Corminas)
1991  Clara foc (Judith Colell)
1992  Art a Catalunya (Pere Portabella)
2000  Foc al càntir (Frederic Amat)

Film direction
1967  L'apat
1967  L'espectador. Habitació amb rellotge. La Ilum. Conversa
1968  La cadira
1969  Preludi de Chopin, Opus 28 No. 7
1970  Play-back (together with Pere Portabella)
1972  Acció Santos (together with Pere Portabella)
1974  Preludi de Chopin, Opus 28 No. 18
1977  El pianista i el conservatori
1977  682-3133 Bufalo Minnesota
1978  Peça per a quatre pianos
1979  La Re Mi La

Scenic musical shows
1983  Beethoven, si tanco la tapa . . . què passa?
1983  Té fina la fina petxina de Xina?
1985  Arganchulla, Arganchulla Gallac
1989  Tramuntana Tremens
1991  La grenya de Pasqual Picanya
1992  Asdrúbila
1995  L'esplèndida vergonya del fet mal fet
1996  Figasantos-fagotrop: missatge al contestador, soparem a les nou
1996  La Pantera Imperial
2000  Ricardo i Elena
2000  El Barbero de Sevilla
2006  El fervor de la perseverança
2008  Brossalobrossotdebrossat

References

External links
Un dit és un dit (a finger is a finger). 36 minutes piece for Cave Canis number 9. MP3.
Official website.
Carles Santos at Youtube.

1940 births
2017 deaths
People from Vinaròs
Composers from the Valencian Community
Musicians from the Valencian Community
Artists from the Valencian Community
Film directors from the Valencian Community
Spanish composers
Spanish male composers
Spanish pianists
Spanish photographers
Sculptors from the Valencian Community
Spanish male actors
Spanish poets
Spanish film directors
Spanish male poets